One Nation may refer to:

Music 
 One Nation (Hype Williams album), 2011
 Onenation, a Japanese record label
 One Nation (band), an English band founded by Robbie France
 One Nation, an album by Dance Nation released in 2007
 "One Nation", a song by Sacred Reich released on Surf Nicaragua, covered by Soulfly

Politics 
 One Nation (infrastructure), an Australian program of infrastructure works in the 1990s
 One Nation (Israel), a defunct party in Israel
 One-nation conservatism, a form of British political conservatism
 One Nation Labour, the theme used by the British Labour Party in 2012
 OneNation, a political party in the United Kingdom
 Pauline Hanson's One Nation, also known as One Nation, a political party in Australia
One Nation NSW, a defunct splinter group, operating exclusively in New South Wales
 World government, the concept of a single common political authority for all of humanity

See also
 
 Our Nation (disambiguation)